Río Lagartos is a town in the state of Yucatán, Mexico. The town lies 42 kilometres north of Tizimín. Mérida is approximately 230 kilometres further west.

Río Lagartos is located at a lagoon, the Ria Lagartos, which is part of a natural reserve. This makes it an ideal place for birdwatching. This lagoon is part of the Petenes mangroves ecoregion, and the Ria Lagartos has been designated as an internationally recognized Important Bird Area (IBA).  In 2004, UNESCO designated the area as Ría Lagartos Biosphere Reserve.

The creek where Francisco Hernandez's 1517 expedition tried to obtain water, was named El Estero de los Lagartos, because of the "many large alligators".

References

 World Wildlife Fund. eds. Mark McGinley, C.Michael Hogan & C.Cleveland. 2010. Petenes mangroves. Encyclopedia of Earth. National Council for Science and the Environment. Washington DC

Photo gallery

External links
Official Website 
 Río Lagartos Photo Essay

Populated places in Yucatán
Tourism in Mexico